Namur station is a Montreal Metro station in the borough of Côte-des-Neiges–Notre-Dame-de-Grâce in Montreal, Quebec, Canada. It is operated by the Société de transport de Montréal (STM) and serves the Orange Line. It is located in the Côte-des-Neiges area. This station has a total of 428 parking spaces in two nearby parking lots.

Overview

The station is a normal side platform station with an entrance at the north end. It was planned in such a way as to allow an additional entrance to be built on the other side of the Décarie Autoroute, but this has not yet happened.

A redevelopment plan for the area is under discussion.

The station was designed by the firm of Labelle, Marchand et Geoffroy. The station's mezzanine contains a giant suspended illuminated aluminum sculpture, entitled Système, by noted Quebec artist Pierre Granche.

Origin of the name
This station is named for Rue Namur, the former name for a portion of Rue Jean-Talon; the road had been renamed by the time the station was opened, so a nearby road (Rue Arnoldi) was renamed Namur in 1980 to allow the station to keep its name. Namur is a city and province in Belgium.

Connecting bus routes

Nearby points of interest

Décarie Autoroute
Hippodrome de Montréal
Walmart
Gibeau Orange Julep
Decarie Square Mall
Montreal SPCA
 Jewish Community Council of Montreal

See also 
 ARTM park and ride lots

References

External links
Namur Station - official web page
Namur metro station geo location
Montreal by Metro, metrodemontreal.com
Parking (Métroparc)
 2011 STM System Map
 Metro Map

Orange Line (Montreal Metro)
Railway stations in Canada opened in 1984
Côte-des-Neiges–Notre-Dame-de-Grâce